Alberto Luiz de Souza or simply Alberto (born April 27, 1975) is a Brazilian former association football striker. He played for a number of Brazilian clubs as well as stints in Mexico, Russia and Japan. He won the 2002 Campeonato Brasileiro Série A with Santos.

Club statistics

References

External links

1975 births
Living people
People from Campo Grande
Brazilian footballers
Brazilian expatriate footballers
Campeonato Brasileiro Série A players
Campeonato Brasileiro Série B players
Liga MX players
Russian Premier League players
J1 League players
Expatriate footballers in Russia
Expatriate footballers in Japan
Expatriate footballers in Mexico
Association football midfielders
Ituano FC players
Paulista Futebol Clube players
Sport Club Internacional players
Atlante F.C. footballers
Club Necaxa footballers
Sociedade Esportiva Palmeiras players
Clube Náutico Capibaribe players
Botafogo Futebol Clube (SP) players
Santos FC players
FC Dynamo Moscow players
Sport Club Corinthians Paulista players
FC Rostov players
Clube Atlético Mineiro players
Coritiba Foot Ball Club players
Ventforet Kofu players
Grêmio Barueri Futebol players
Ceará Sporting Club players
Esporte Clube Comercial (MS) players
Grêmio Catanduvense de Futebol players
Sportspeople from Mato Grosso do Sul